Mathura Cantonment railway station is a small railway station in Mathura district, Uttar Pradesh. Its code is MRT. It serves the Mathura cantonment area of Mathura city. The station has two platforms, not well-sheltered. It lacks many facilities including sanitation.But overall it has some basic facilities like Water tap and Food Shops.

Trains 

Some of the important trains that serve Mathura Cantonment are :

 Achhnera–Kasganj Fast Passenger 
 Agra Fort–Ramnagar Weekly Express
 Agra Fort–Kasganj Passenger
 Ahmedabad–Lucknow Weekly Express
 Bharatpur–Kasganj Passenger
 Jaipur–Lucknow Express
 Kanpur Central–Bandra Terminus Weekly Express
 Kasganj–Mathura Passenger (unreserved)

References

External links

 wikimapia

Railway stations in Mathura district
Izzatnagar railway division
Transport in Mathura